The Red Circle ("红圈" in Chinese) is an informal term for leading law firms in China that are perceived as prestigious or high-quality, similar to the Magic Circle firms in the UK and white-shoe firms in the US.

The term was first used by The Lawyer magazine in a report in March 2014, which used the term to define eight top-tier law firms in China. The eight firms include: Commerce & Finance (通商), Global Law Office (环球), Haiwen & Partners (海问), Jingtian & Gongcheng (竞天公诚), Jun He Law Offices (君合), King & Wood Mallesons (金杜), Zhong Lun (中伦), in Beijing; and Fangda (方达) in Shanghai. The list was later repeated by The Lawyer in its 2014 issue of a China-focused legal market report. Since then, it has gained wide popularity within the Chinese legal community as well as law graduates when it comes to recruitment. 

Although their sizes vary greatly, the Red Circle firms have much higher average revenue per lawyer (RPL), revenue per equity partner (RPP) and profit per equity partner (PEP) compared to their top 30 rivals. 

However, according to The Lawyer, two firms outside of the conventional Red Circle group – Beijing-based elite firm Han Kun (汉坤) and Shanghai-based LLinks (通力) – stand out from the crowd, having exceeded the Red Circle threshold across the RPL, RPP and PEP metrics in 2017.

See also
List of largest Chinese law firms
Magic Circle (law firms)
White-shoe firm
Big Four (law firms)

References

Law firms of China
Neologisms